Muñequitas porteñas is a 1931  Argentine film directed by José A. Ferreyra. It was the first sound film made in Argentina, although the Vitaphone sound disks are now considered lost.

Cast
 Antonio Ber Ciani	... 	Rodolfo
 Julio Bunge	... 	Peluquero
 Floren Delbene	... 	Alberto
 Arturo Forte	... 	Héctor Laborda
 Dionisio Giácomo	... 	Marinero
 Laura Montiel	... 	Adela
 Serafín Paoli	... 	Don Nicola
 Edel Randon	... 	Blanca
 Mario Soffici	... 	Don Antonio
 Rivela Toñetti	... 	Margot
 María Turgenova	... 	María Esther

References

External links
 

1931 films
1930s Spanish-language films
Argentine black-and-white films
1930s Argentine films